Landsberg am Lech (Landsberg at the Lech) is a town in southwest Bavaria, Germany, about 65 kilometers west of Munich and 35 kilometers south of Augsburg. It is the capital of the district of Landsberg am Lech.

Overview

Landsberg is situated on the Romantic Road and is the center of the Lechrain region, the boundary region between Swabia and Bavaria. It is noted for its picturesque historic center.

Landsberg am Lech developed where a major historic salt road crossed over the Lech. To protect the bridge, Duke Henry the Lion ordered a castle to be built, Castrum Landespurch, incorporating an older settlement and castle named Phetine. Soon a greater settlement evolved, which received its town charter as early as the 13th century.

In 1315, the town burned down, but was rebuilt because of its important location. In 1320, Landsberg was permitted to collect salt duties, bringing considerable wealth to the town. In 1419, a river tax added a further source of income.

The town is noted for its prison where Adolf Hitler was incarcerated in 1924. During this incarceration Hitler wrote/dictated his book Mein Kampf together with Rudolf Hess. His cell, number 7, became part of the Nazi cult and many followers came to visit it during the German Nazi-period. Landsberg am Lech was also known as the town of the Hitler Youth.

It is the birthplace of the Nobel laureate Erwin Neher.

Geography

Town areas
The town comprises three main areas. The historic old town centre of Landsberg, which lies between the river Lech and its easterly elevated bank. The area to the west of the Lech (Katharinenvorstadt, Neuerpfting, Weststadt, Schwaighofsiedlung – today by far the biggest part of the town) and the area on the easterly elevated bank (Bayervorstadt) developed since the early 19th century.

Also belonging to Landsberg are the hamlets of Sandau and Pössing as well as the former independent boroughs of Ellighofen, Erpfting (with Friedheim, Geratshof and Mittelstetten), Pitzling (with Pöring) and Reisch (with Thalhofen).

Landsberg Concentration Camp and displaced person camp
The Landsberg camp began as a Nazi concentration camp.  By October 1944, there were more than 5,000 prisoners in the camp.

The camp was liberated on 27 April 1945 by the 12th Armored Division of the United States Army. Upon orders from General Taylor, the American forces allowed news media to record the atrocities, and ordered local German civilians and guards to reflect upon the dead and bury them bare-handed. A dramatization of the discovery and liberation of the camp was presented in Episode 9: Why We Fight of the Band of Brothers mini-series.

After the liberation, it became a displaced person (DP) camp, primarily for Jewish refugees from the Soviet Union and the Baltic states. The DP camp closed on 15 October 1950.

In December 2019, Israeli academic and translator Ilana Hammerman wrote of the difficulties she encountered in trying to visit the site of the concentration camp and to find the memorial to the victims. She noted that "[f]or decades after the war, local residents and the authorities endeavored to ignore its existence and consign it to oblivion". Since 1983 Anton Posset and the association called Landsberg im 20. Jahrhundert are working on the commemorating this part of history and established based on donations the European Holocaust Memorial on the former concentration camp Kaufering VII.

Transport

Notable people
Lanspergius (1489–1539), Carthusian monk and ascetical writer
Ignaz Kögler (1680–1746), Jesuit missionary and mathematician
Dominikus Zimmermann (1685–1766), architect
Sir Hubert von Herkomer (1849–1914), artist, film and theatre director
Alois Wolfmüller (1864–1948), inventor and aeronautical engineer
Wilhelm Ritter von Leeb (1876–1956), World War II field marshal and war criminal
George Remus (1878–1952), attorney and famed bootlegger during U.S. Prohibition
Adolf Hitler (1889–1945), dictator (was in prison in Landsberg 1923/24)
Luise Rinser (1911–2002), writer and politician
Johnny Cash (1932–2003), American singer/songwriter stationed in the Landsberg-Lech Airbase from 1951 until his discharge in 1954 while serving in the U.S. Air Force
Siegfried Rauch (1932–2018), actor
Samuel Bak (born 1933), painter and writer
Anton Posset (1941–2015), holocaust researcher and founder of the European Holocaust Memorial located in Landsberg
Erwin Neher (born 1944), biologist
Julian Nagelsmann (born 1987), football manager
Michael Unterbuchner (born 1988), darts player
Florian Neuhaus (born 1997), footballer

Twin towns – sister cities

Landsberg am Lech is twinned with:

 Hudson, United States (1984)
 Saint-Laurent-du-Var, France (1986)
 Bushey, England, United Kingdom (1989)
 Rocca di Papa, Italy (1989)
 Waldheim, Germany (1990)
 Siófok, Hungary (2002)

Sports
Landsberg is home to the following sports clubs:

Sources
 
 Thomas Raithel, Die Strafanstalt Landsberg am Lech und der Spöttinger Friedhof (1944-1958). Eine Dokumentation im Auftrag des Instituts für Zeitgeschichte München-Berlin (München: Oldenbourg 2009).

References

External links

 Official Website (in German) 
 European Holocaust Memorial Citizens´Association European Holocaust Memorial Foundation
 The Holocaust in the Landsberg area - Citizens´ Association "Landsberg in the 20th Century" (English)
Landsberger lager-cajtung (Landsberg am Lech, Germany), B1110 is a digitized periodical at the Leo Baeck Institute, New York

Landsberg (district)